

Alberta

Newbrook Observatory (disused)
Oldman River Observatory, Lethbridge Astronomical Society, Lethbridge
Rothney Astrophysical Observatory, University of Calgary, Priddis, Alberta
Sulphur Mountain Cosmic Ray Station (historic site)
Sunridge Observatory, south of Medicine Hat
Telus World of Science Edmonton RASC Observatory, Edmonton
Wilson Coulee Observatory, RASC Calgary Centre, De Winton, Alberta
Eagle Butte Observatory, South of Dunmore

British Columbia

Dominion Radio Astrophysical Observatory, Penticton
Mount Kobau National Observatory, Mount Kobau (Never built)
University of British Columbia Observatory, Vancouver
Dominion Astrophysical Observatory, Herzberg Institute of Astrophysics, Victoria
Gordon MacMillan Southam Observatory, H.R. Macmillan Space Centre, Vancouver
Large Zenith Telescope, University of British Columbia (at Malcolm Knapp Research Forest) (Decommissioned)
Trottier Observatory, Simon Fraser University, Burnaby
Prince George Astronomical Observatory, Prince George

Manitoba

Glenlea Astronomical Observatory, Univ. of Manitoba/RASC Winnipeg Centre, Winnipeg

New Brunswick
Université de Moncton observatory
Mount Allison University Gemini Observatory
Moncton High School Observatory

Newfoundland and Labrador

Grenfell Observatory

Nova Scotia

Burke-Gaffney Observatory

Ontario

Algonquin Radio Observatory, Algonquin Provincial Park
Boltwood Observatory, Stittsville
Dominion Meteorological Building, 315 Bloor Street West, Toronto - now home to Munk School of Global Affairs
Dominion Observatory, Ottawa
David Dunlap Observatory, Richmond Hill
David Thompson Astronomical Observatory, Fort William Historical Park, Thunder Bay
Elginfield Astronomical Observatory, Middlesex Centre
Gustav Bakos Observatory, University of Waterloo, Waterloo
Queen's University Observatory, Queen's University, Kingston
Hume Cronyn Memorial Observatory, University of Western Ontario, London
Kessler Observatory, Carleton University, Ottawa
Killarney Provincial Park Observatory
Long Point Observatory, St. Williams
Sudbury Neutrino Observatory, Sudbury
Toronto Magnetic and Meteorological Observatory
York University Observatory, North York (Toronto)

Quebec

ASTER Observatory, Saint-Louis-du-Ha! Ha!
Bishop's University Astronomical Observatory
Mont Mégantic Observatory

Saskatchewan

Cypress Observatory, Cypress Hills Interprovincial Park Centre Block, Maple Creek
Davin Observatory, RASC Regina Centre, Davin
Saskatchewan Science Centre Observatory, Regina
Sleaford Observatory, RASC Saskatoon Centre, north of Colonsay
Super Dual Auroral Radar Network (SuperDARN), University of Saskatchewan
University of Saskatchewan Observatory, Saskatoon
Wilkinson Memorial Observatory, Eastend

See also
 List of observatories

References

Observatories in Canada
Astronomical observatories